Benjamin R. Frederick (born July 8, 1982) is a Republican member of the Michigan House of Representatives and the former mayor of Owosso.

Biography
An Owosso native, Frederick was elected to the city council in 2007 and was selected by the council as mayor in 2009.

Prior to his election to the House, Frederick worked for three members of the Michigan Legislature.

Electoral history

2016

References

External links
 Campaign website
 Official website

1982 births
21st-century American politicians
Liberty University alumni
Living people
Mayors of places in Michigan
Michigan city council members
People from Owosso, Michigan
Republican Party members of the Michigan House of Representatives